Appendicularia is a genus of plants in the family Melastomataceae.

Species
The genus has two species:
 Appendicularia entomophila
 Appendicularia thymifolia

References

 Chen Cheih. 1984. Melastomataceae. In: Chen Cheih, ed., Fl. Reipubl. Popularis Sin. 53(1): 135–293.
 DC. Publication : Prodr. (DC.) 3: 114 1828 [mid Mar 1828]
 KBD: Kew Bibliographic Databases of Royal Botanic Gardens, Kew.

External links
 PPP-Index

Melastomataceae
Melastomataceae genera